Creoleon is a genus of antlions (neuropteran insects in the family Myrmeleontidae) in the subfamily Myrmeleontinae. It is an extant genus but there is at least one fossil species.

References

External links 
 
 
 
 Creoleon at insectoid.info

Myrmeleontinae
Myrmeleontidae genera